Sandringham is a suburb of Johannesburg, South Africa. It is a suburb that lies close to Glenhazel and Sydenham. It is located in Region E of the City of Johannesburg Metropolitan Municipality.

History
Prior to the discovery of gold on the Witwatersrand in 1886, the suburb lay on land on one of the original farms called Rietfontein. It became a suburb on 26 July 1944 and became part of Johannesburg on 10 October 1944, named after Sandringham House in England.

References

Johannesburg Region E